On Friday, 14 September 2007, ORB International, an independent polling agency located in London, published estimates of the total war casualties in Iraq since the US-led invasion of Iraq in 2003. At over 1.2 million deaths (1,220,580), this estimate is the highest number published so far. From the poll margin of error of +/-2.5% ORB calculated a range of 733,158 to 1,446,063 deaths. The ORB estimate was performed by a random survey of 1,720 adults aged 18+, out of which 1,499 responded, in fifteen of the eighteen governorates within Iraq, between August 12 and August 19, 2007. In comparison, the 2006 Lancet survey suggested almost half this number (654,965 deaths) through the end of June 2006. The Lancet authors calculated a range of 392,979 to 942,636 deaths.

On 28 January 2008, ORB published an update based on additional work carried out in rural areas of Iraq. Some 600 additional interviews were undertaken September 20 to 24, 2007. As a result of this the death estimate was revised to 1,033,000 with a given range of 946,000 to 1,120,000. As well as estimating the number of deaths the ORB poll also showed that despite the violence only 26% of Iraqis preferred life under Saddam Hussein's regime, while 49% said that they preferred life under the current political system.

This ORB estimate has been criticised as exaggerated and ill-founded in peer reviewed literature.

Survey question and results 

Participants of the ORB survey were asked the following question:

How many members of your household, if any, have died as a result of the conflict in Iraq since 2003 (ie as a result of violence rather than a natural death such as old age)? Please note that I mean those who were actually living under your roof.

The revised results were

Causes of death 

ORB reported that "48% died from a gunshot wound, 20% from the impact of a car bomb, 9% from aerial bombardment, 6% as a result of an accident and 6% from another blast/ordnance."

Methodology 

From the September 14, 2007 ORB press release concerning the first set of interviews:

 Results are based on face-to-face interviews amongst a nationally representative sample of 1,720 adults aged 18+ throughout Iraq (1,499 agreed to answer the question on household deaths)
 The standard margin of error on the sample who answered (1,499) is +2.5%
 The methodology uses multi-stage random probability sampling and covers fifteen of the eighteen governorates within Iraq. For security reasons Karbala and Al Anbar were not included. Irbil was excluded as the authorities refused the field team a permit.

Their pollster was Dr. Munqeth Daghir, founding director of the Independent Institute for Administration and Civil Society Studies (IIACS). ORB described IIACSS as a “polling/ research company established in Iraq in 2003 and which has a network of interviewers covering all regions of the country."

ORB is a member of the British Polling Council.

Estimated range of deaths 

The 2005 census reported 4,050,597 households. From this ORB calculated 1,220,580 deaths since the 2003 invasion. From the poll margin of error of 2.5% ORB came up with a range of 733,158 to 1,446,063 deaths.

January 2008 update: 1,033,000 deaths 

Opinion Research Business published an update to the survey on 28 January 2008, based on additional work carried out in rural areas of Iraq. Some 600 additional interviews were undertaken and as a result of this the death estimate was revised to 1,033,000 with a given range of 946,000 to 1,120,000.

Criticism 

The ORB poll estimate has come under criticism in a peer reviewed paper entitled "Conflict Deaths in Iraq: A Methodological Critique of the ORB Survey Estimate", published in the journal Survey Research Methods. This paper "describes in detail how the ORB poll is riddled with critical inconsistencies and methodological shortcomings", and concludes that the ORB poll is "too flawed, exaggerated and ill-founded to contribute to discussion of the human costs of the Iraq war".

Epidemiologist Francisco Checci echoed these conclusions in a 2010 BBC World Service interview, stating that he thinks the ORB estimate was "too high" and "implausible". Checci, like the paper above, says that a "major weakness" of the poll was a failure to adequately distinguish between households and extended family.

The Iraq Body Count project also rejected what they called the "hugely exaggerated death toll figures" of ORB, citing the Survey Research Methods paper, which Josh Dougherty of IBC co-wrote. IBC concluded that, "The pressing need is for more truth rooted in real experience, not the manipulation of numbers disconnected from reality."

John Rentoul, a columnist for The Independent newspaper, has asserted that the ORB estimate "exaggerate[s] the toll by a factor of as much as 10" and that "the ORB estimate has rarely been treated as credible by responsible media organisations, but it is still widely repeated by cranks and the ignorant."

See also

Casualties of the Iraq War. An overview of many casualty estimates.
Iraq War. Infobox there has the most up-to-date casualty figures.
Lancet surveys of Iraq War casualties
Iraq Family Health Survey

References

Iraq War casualties
Death in Iraq
Surveys (human research)